Kenny Phillips (1959 – October 23, 2015) was an American college football player and coach. He served as the head football coach at Fayetteville State University in Fayetteville, North Carolina from 2002 to 2012, compiling a record of 75–63. Phillips led the Fayetteville State Broncos to three Central Intercollegiate Athletic Association (CIAA) titles, in 2002, 2003, and 2009. He was named CIAA Coach of the Year twice, in 2002 and 2009. He was married to Beverly Ellison Phillips and the father of two daughters; Kendra and Kennedy. 

Phillips died on October 23, 2015, after a suffering from cancer.

Head coaching record

References

External links
 Hampton profile

1959 births
2015 deaths
American football defensive backs
American football linebackers
Chowan Hawks football coaches
Chowan Hawks football players
East Carolina Pirates football coaches
East Carolina Pirates football players
Fayetteville State Broncos football coaches
Hampton Pirates football coaches
NC State Wolfpack football coaches
North Carolina A&T Aggies football coaches
Ohio Bobcats football coaches
Sportspeople from Greenville, North Carolina
Coaches of American football from North Carolina
Players of American football from North Carolina
African-American coaches of American football
African-American players of American football
20th-century African-American sportspeople
21st-century African-American sportspeople